The following is a list of the MuchMusic Video Awards winners for "Best Director".

MuchMusic Video Awards